Al-Muharraqa was a Palestinian Arab village in the Gaza Subdistrict, located  east of Gaza city. The village laid on rolling terrain on the southern coastal plain of Palestine, on a bend in the wadi. Al-Muharraqa was depopulated during the 1948 Arab-Israeli War.

History
Although not mentioned in Byzantine sources, al-Muharraqa was inhabited during this period, according to archaeological evidence. Byzantine ceramics, together with fragments of marble columns and a fragmentary mosaic pavement with  geometric patterns have been found.

During the Mamluk period from the 13th to 15th centuries, the lands and surplus agricultural produce of al-Muharraqa were dedicated as a waqf for the maintenance of the Dome of the Rock in Jerusalem and the Great Mosque of Gaza.

Ottoman era
It was incorporated into the Ottoman Empire in 1517, and in a sijill (royal order) from  941/1535 all of the revenue from Al-Muharraqa went to Ribat al-Mansuri (Com.); a hospital in Jerusalem started by Al-Mansur Qalawun in 1282.  In the 1596 tax records, it was under the administration of the nahiya of Gaza, part of the Sanjak of Gaza, with a population of 83 Muslim households, an estimated 457 persons. The  villagers paid a fixed tax rate of  25% on a number of crops, including wheat, barley, beehives, and goats; a total of 26,600 akçe. All of  the revenue went to a Waqf.

Al-Muharraqa was likely abandoned in either the 17th or 18th century, since it lacked mention by travellers, but was repopulated in the late 1870s.

In 1838 Edward Robinson noted it as  el Muhurrakah, in the Gaza district, being "in ruins or deserted".

In 1883  the PEF's Survey of Western Palestine found of archaeological  remains at the place, called Khürbet Muntaret el Baghl,  "a  few scattered stones and ruined rubble cisterns on a slope."

British mandate era
During the British Mandate period, the overall layout of the village was rectangular, and continued to expand in a rectangular pattern along the roads leading to the highway and the village of Kawfakha.
In the 1922 census of Palestine, Muharraqa had a population of 204 Muslims, increasing in the  1931 census when Muharraqa had a population of 354 Muslims  in 86 houses.

In the 1945 statistics  Al-Muharraqa  had a population of  580  Muslims,  with a total of 4,855  dunams of land, according to an official land and population survey.  Of this, 12  dunams were used  for plantations and irrigable land, 4,622  for cereals, while 39 dunams were public built-up land.

The houses of the village were constructed of mud bricks, and there was a mosque and a school; the latter opened in 1945 with an enrollment of 60 students. The mosque, school, and a number of small shops constituted al-Muharraqa's nucleus. Water for household use was primarily obtained from a slightly salty  well, but was supplemented with rainwater which collected in some shallow domestic wells. Agriculture was the main source of income, especially the village's chief crop, barley. Figs, grapes, and almonds were also cultivated.

1948 War, and aftermath
During the 1948 Arab-Israeli War, the village with Kawfakha was raided by the Palmach's Negev Brigade on May 27–28, and a correspondent for The New York Times reported it was officially captured on May 29. Israeli historian Benny Morris claims most of al-Muharraqa's inhabitants were driven out at that time, but it was not thoroughly destroyed and depopulated until August 16; Israeli forces were officially observing the second truce, however, Morris writes that they proceeded to mine and destroy the village for "military reasons".

Following the war the area was incorporated into the State of Israel and the moshav of Yakhini was built north of the village site in 1950 on village land.

Palestinian historian Walid Khalidi described the village remains in 1992:The site is overgrown with thorny plants and short grasses and surrounded by eucalyptus trees. It is marked by piles of rubble from buildings, including the village diwan (a meeting and guest house). There are also the remnants of a mill and a well. The cemetery, overgrown with wild vegetation, still exists, in a dilapidated condition, and the fallen superstructure of one of the tombs is visible. The lands in the vicinity are cultivated by farmers.

See also
Depopulated Palestinian locations in Israel

References

Bibliography

External links
Welcome To al-Muharraqa
al-Muharraqa,  Zochrot
Survey of Western Palestine, Map 20:   IAA, Wikimedia commons 
al-Muharraqa from the Khalil Sakakini Cultural Center

Arab villages depopulated during the 1948 Arab–Israeli War
District of Gaza